Ardonea nigella is a moth of the subfamily Arctiinae. It was described by Paul Dognin in 1905. It is found in Ecuador.

References

Moths described in 1905
Lithosiini
Moths of South America